Miyama (written: 美山 lit. "beauty mountain", 深山 lit. "mountain recess" or 宮間) is a Japanese surname. Notable people with the surname include:

, Japanese footballer
, Japanese artist
, Japanese actress
, Japanese boxer
, Japanese footballer

Japanese-language surnames